Billy Anderson (15 August 1892 – 5 January 1959) was an  Australian rules footballer who played with St Kilda in the Victorian Football League (VFL).

Notes

External links 

1892 births
1954 deaths
Australian rules footballers from Victoria (Australia)
St Kilda Football Club players
South Yarra Football Club players